Lewis Allaire Scott (February 11, 1759 – March 17, 1798) was an American politician.

Life
He was the son of John Morin Scott and Helena Rutgers Scott.

On January 18, 1785, he married Julianna Sitgreaves (sister of Samuel Sitgreaves), and their son was Mayor of Philadelphia John Morin Scott (1789–1858).

He was Secretary of State of New York from 1784 until his death in office.

He was buried at Trinity Church, New York.

Sources
 Political Graveyard
 His ancestry, at Illian
 Descendants of Lewis Allaire Scott
Google Books The Lifes of Eminent Philadelphians, Now Deceased by Henry Simpson (W. Brotherhead, Philadelphia, 1859, pages 867ff on Philadelphia Mayor J. M. Scott and his ancestors)

1759 births
1798 deaths
Politicians from New York City
Secretaries of State of New York (state)